Tai Om is a village in Lam Tsuen, Tai Po District, Hong Kong.

Administration
Tai Om is a recognized village under the New Territories Small House Policy.

History
At the time of the 1911 census, the population of Tai Om was 162. The number of males was 74.

Conservation
The Tai Om Feng Shui Woodland, covering an area of 2.7 hectares, was designated as a Site of Special Scientific Interest in 2005.

References

External links

 Delineation of area of existing village Tai Om (Tai Po) for election of resident representative (2019 to 2022)
 Antiquities Advisory Board. Historic Building Appraisal. Luk Tak Study Hall, No. 36 Tai Om Pictures
 Antiquities Advisory Board. Historic Building Appraisal. Yuk Yin Study Hall, No. 37 Tai Om Pictures

Villages in Tai Po District, Hong Kong
Lam Tsuen